The Red Dot Design Award is a German international design prize awarded by Red Dot GmbH & Co. KG. There are prize categories for product design, brands and communication design, and design concept. Since 1955, designers and producers can apply for the prizes, with the winners being presented in an annual ceremony. Winning products are presented among others in the Red Dot Design Museum on the premises of the historical Zollverein Coal Mine Industrial Complex in Essen. The Red Dot Design Museum Essen, the first Red Dot Design Museum, was built in 1997. The second Red Dot Design Museum was built in Singapore in 2005. The Red Dot Design Award had more than 15,500 submissions from 70 countries in 2014, and in 2016 alone, 1,559 Red Dots were awarded, 102 of them in the "Best of the Best" category. It is considered one of the most prestigious awards in the design industry.

Cost 

As of April 2020, the registration fee for consideration of a Red Dot award ranges from €99 (for an individual designer in the Design Concept category) to €510 (for a latecomer in the Product Design category), excl. VAT.

Those who win a Red Dot award are required to purchase an additional "Winner Package", the price of which ranges up to €5,999.

Categories 

The Red Dot is awarded in three different categories:

Red Dot Award: Product Design 
The oldest of the three awards, the Red Dot Award: Product Design, had been known as Design Innovationen until 2000. The competition is open to several fields of manufacturing, including furniture, home appliances, machines, cars, and tools. The prize-winners include Berendsohn in 2003, Inga Sempé in 2007, De Vorm in 2012, and Lunar Design in 2015. TROIKE was the 2016 winner with the bottle opener called "Circus".

Red Dot Award: Brands & Communication Design 
The Red Dot Award: Brands & Communication Design recognizes the best brands and creative works of the year. It is split into two sections: Brands and Communication Design and awards the following prizes: Red Dot, Red Dot: Agency of the Year, Red Dot: Best of the Best, Red Dot: Brand of the Year, Red Dot: Grand Prix, and Red Dot: Junior Prize. All entries are assessed by the Red Dot Jury in line with the guiding principle "in search of good design and creativity".

Red Dot Award: Design Concept  
In 2005, Red Dot established the Red Dot Design Museum Singapore as well as an award for design innovations and design concepts. The Red Dot Award: Design Concept focuses on design concepts, ideas, and visions. The competition is targeted toward young, up-and-coming creative talents, designers, and design companies around the world. Flint won the 2015 Red Dot Award: Design Concept.

References

External links
 

Essen
German awards
German design
Industrial design awards
Awards established in 1955
1955 establishments in West Germany